Léonce Lavagne (born 17 February 1940) is a French professional football player and later manager who played as a defender. He is the father of Denis Lavagne.

References

1940 births
Living people
French footballers
Association football defenders
Racing Club de France Football players
FC Rouen players
Le Havre AC players
Ligue 2 players
French football managers
Le Havre AC managers
Nîmes Olympique managers
SC Bastia managers
ASOA Valence managers
Ligue 1 managers
Ligue 2 managers
Sportspeople from Béziers
Footballers from Occitania (administrative region)